Justice Mir Khuda Bakhsh Marri (1926 – 14 May 2006) was the Governor of Balochistan, Pakistan from 5 July 1977 – 18 September 1978. He was appointed as Chief Justice of Sindh and Balochistan, Pakistan in 1976. He also served as acting Chief Minister of Balochistan in 1989.He belongs to a remote district known as Kohlu in Balochistan. He did his bar-at-law from Lincoln's Inn, London. He, along with rendering his services as a chief justice and governor, is also an author. His eldest son Mir Shahnawaz Khan Marri served as DG coal and minerals Balochistan, provincial secretary as well contesting In election through which he became Minister of Balochistan for sports, culture and youth affairs.

Marri died in Switzerland on 14 May 2006, aged 80.

References

Baloch people
Governors of Balochistan, Pakistan
1926 births
2006 deaths